Robert Samuel Hall (March 10, 1879 – June 10, 1941) was a U.S. Representative from Mississippi.

Born in Williamsburg, Mississippi, Hall attended the common schools of Williamsburg and Hattiesburg, Mississippi. He taught school in Hancock County, Mississippi, in 1894. He was graduated from Millsaps College, Jackson, Mississippi, in 1898. He owned and edited the Hattiesburg Citizen from 1895 to 1900 and from 1920 to 1925.

Hall was graduated from the law department of Millsaps College in 1900. He was admitted to the bar the same year and commenced practice in Hattiesburg. He served as member of the State senate 1906-1908. He served as delegate to the Democratic National Convention in 1908. He served as prosecuting attorney of Forrest County 1910–1912, as district attorney of the twelfth judicial district from 1912 to 1918, and as circuit judge of that district from 1918 to 1929.

Hall was elected as a Democrat to the Seventy-first and Seventy-second Congresses (March 4, 1929 – March 3, 1933). He served as chairman of the Committee on Irrigation and Reclamation (Seventy-second Congress). He was an unsuccessful candidate for renomination in 1932.

He was employed in the legal division of the Federal Trade Commission in Washington, D.C., from 1933 until his death in Arlington, Virginia, June 10, 1941. He was interred in the Old City Cemetery, Hattiesburg, Mississippi.

References

1879 births
1941 deaths
Democratic Party Mississippi state senators
Mississippi state court judges
Democratic Party members of the United States House of Representatives from Mississippi